The Essential Men at Work is the eighth compilation album by Australian band Men at Work, released in 2003. It was released by Sony BMG, as part of The Essential series. The album includes 14 tracks from Men at Work three studio albums.

Reception 

Matt Collar of AllMusic stated "The Essential Men at Work features 14 of the iconic '80s band's most memorable tracks" and claims "this is about all the Men at Work you'll ever need.

Track listing

Release history

References

External links
Men At Work - The Essential Men At Work at Discogs

Men at Work compilation albums
2003 greatest hits albums
Columbia Records compilation albums